Johann Sebastian Bach composed the church cantata  (I go forth and seek with longing), 49, in Leipzig for the twentieth Sunday after Trinity Sunday and first performed it on 3 November 1726. It is a solo cantata, a dialogue of soprano and bass.

History and words 
Bach composed the cantata in his fourth year in Leipzig for the 20th Sunday after Trinity. It is counted as part of his third cantata cycle. The prescribed readings for the Sunday were from the Epistle to the Ephesians, "walk circumspectly ... filled with the Spirit", and from the Gospel of Matthew, the parable of the great banquet. The source for the dialogue is, here as in many works of the 17th century, the Song of Songs. Poet Christoph Birkmann derived from the wedding feast of the Gospel the Soul as the bride whom Jesus invited to their wedding, while the other characters of the story are not mentioned in the cantata. Instead of a closing chorale, Bach combines this idea, sung by the bass, with the seventh stanza of Philipp Nicolai's mystical wedding song "", given to the soprano.

Bach first performed the cantata on 3 November 1726.

Scoring and structure 
Bach structured the cantata six movements and scored it for soprano and bass soloists, and a Baroque instrumental ensemble of oboe d'amore, two violins, viola, violoncello piccolo, organ and basso continuo. Klaus Hofmann summarizes: "Bach has clothed his music in the 'wedding garments' of exquisite scoring".

 Sinfonia
 Aria (bass): 
 Recitative (soprano, bass): 
 Aria (soprano): 
 Recitative (soprano, bass): 
 Aria (bass) + Chorale (soprano):  –

Music 
The cantata is opened by a sinfonia for concertante organ and orchestra, probably the final movement of a lost concerto composed in Köthen, the model for the Concerto II in E major, BWV 1053, for harpsichord. Two weeks before, Bach had used the two other movements of that concerto in his cantata . The bass as the  sings the words of Jesus. In the soprano aria "" (I am glorious, I am beautiful) the bride reflects her beauty as dressed in "" (The justice of His salvation), accompanied by oboe d'amore and violoncello piccolo. The cantata ends not with the usual four-part chorale, but with a love duet of the Soul (soprano) and Jesus (bass). It incorporates a chorale, stanza 7 of Nicolai's hymn, ending with the line "" (I wait for Thee with longing), while the bass responds: "I have always loved you, and so I draw you to me. I'm coming soon. I stand before the door: open up, my abode!" John Eliot Gardiner describes the mood of the music, accompanied by the obbligato organ, as "religious-erotic". Hofmann notes that the figuration of the organ expresses in sound what the cantus firmus words: "" (How sincerely happy I am!) Musicologist Julian Mincham suggests that this cantata "exudes a greater degree of personal intensity" than the previous two for this day, BWV 162 and 180.

Recordings 
 Westfälische Kantorei, Wilhelm Ehmann. J. S. Bach: Cantatas BWV 49 & BWV 84. Nonesuch, 1961.
 Bach-Collegium Stuttgart, Helmuth Rilling. Die Bach Kantate. Hänssler, 1982.
 Ensemble Baroque de Limoges, Christophe Coin. J. S. Bach: Cantatas with Violoncelle Piccolo. Auvidis Astrée, 1993.
 La Petite Bande, Sigiswald Kuijken. J. S. Bach: Cantatas BWV 82 · 49 · 58. Accent, 1993.
 Amsterdam Baroque Orchestra & Choir, Ton Koopman, J. S. Bach: Complete Cantatas Vol. 16, Antoine Marchand 2004.
 Bach Collegium Japan, Masaaki Suzuki, J. S. Bach Cantatas BWV 149, 145, 174, 49, BIS.

References

Sources 
 
 Ich geh und suche mit Verlangen BWV 49; BC A 150 / Sacred cantata (20th Sunday after Trinity) Bach Digital
 Cantata BWV 49 Ich geh und suche mit Verlangen: history, scoring, sources for text and music, translations to various languages, discography, discussion, Bach Cantatas Website
 BWV 49 Ich geh und suche mit Verlangen: English translation, University of Vermont
 BWV 49 Ich geh und suche mit Verlangen: text, scoring, University of Alberta

External links 
 Ich geh und suche mit Verlangen, BWV 49: performance by the Netherlands Bach Society (video and background information)

Church cantatas by Johann Sebastian Bach
1726 compositions